Kura may refer to:

Places 
 Kura, Iran (disambiguation)
 Kura Island, Azerbaijan
 Kura, Nigeria, a Local Government Area of Kano State
 Kura (river), a river in Turkey, Georgia, and Azerbaijan
 Kura (Russia), a river in Russia
 Kura Test Range, a testing site in Kamchatka Krai, Russia

Other uses 
 eclipse Kura, an interoperability testing open source project for M2M applications
 Kuhl's lorikeet, a bird
 Kura (music producer) (born 1987), Portuguese electro house music DJ and producer
 Kura (company), formerly Response, a contact centre company in Glasgow
 Kura (film), a 1995 Japanese film
 Kura Kaupapa Māori, Māori language immersion schools in New Zealand
 Kura Sushi, a sushi restaurant chain in Japan
 Kura (saddle), a Japanese saddle
 Kura (storehouse), a traditional Japanese storehouse
 Kura (deity), a god from 3rd millennium Ebla

See also 
 Kur River (disambiguation)